is a Japanese manga series written and illustrated by Yuama. It has been serialized in Ichijinsha's yuri manga magazine Comic Yuri Hime since May 2020.

Publication
Written and illustrated by Yuama, The Summer You Were There started in Ichijinsha's yuri manga magazine Comic Yuri Hime on May 18, 2020. Ichijinsha has collected its chapters into individual tankōbon volumes. The first volume was released on January 18, 2021. As of March 16, 2023, five volumes have been released. The series is set to end with its sixth volume.

The manga has been licensed for English release in North America by Seven Seas Entertainment.

Volume list

References

External links
  
 

2020s LGBT literature
Ichijinsha manga
Romance anime and manga
Seven Seas Entertainment titles
Slice of life anime and manga
Yuri (genre) anime and manga